Calliclava craneana is a species of sea snail, a marine gastropod mollusk in the family Drilliidae.

Description
The shell grows to a  length of 21 mm.

Distribution
This species occurs in the Pacific Ocean off Panama.

References

External links
 

craneana
Gastropods described in 1951